Gillian Hitchen married name Gillian Cadman (born 1957), is a female former athlete who competed for England.

Athletics career
Hitchen was a National Champion after winning the 1978 UK Athletics Championships title in the high jump.

She represented England in the high jump, at the 1978 Commonwealth Games in Edmonton, Alberta, Canada.

References

1957 births
Sportspeople from Wigan
English female high jumpers
British female high jumpers
Commonwealth Games competitors for England
Athletes (track and field) at the 1978 Commonwealth Games
Living people